Star of Zion is the official publication of the A.M.E. Zion church. For many years it was published as a newspaper. First published in 1876 it is among the oldest African American publications in North Carolina and the oldest continuously published. The site of its publication moved several times. The University of North Carolina Libraries have many editions of the newspaper digitized and available online. The American Theological Library Association has a collection of the newspaper’s editions on microfilm.

Since 1894 it has been published in Charlotte. The paper had a Republican affiliation prior to Franklin D. Roosevelt’s presidency in the 1930s.

A publication called The Zion Church Advocate was planned initially but never printed.

Sarah Dudley Pettey wrote articles for the paper. John Campbell Dancy and then George W. Clinton served as business managers for the paper.

References

Website
Star of Zion website

1876 establishments in North Carolina
African Methodist Episcopal Zion Church